Lake Roland or Roland Lake may refer to:

 Lake Roland (Maryland), in the United States
 Lake Roland (park), Maryland
 Roland Lake (Minnesota)
 Lake Roland (Ontario), in Canada